is a former Japanese footballer. He last played for Ehime F.C.

Honors and awards

Oita Trinita
 J. League Cup (1) - 2008

Career statistics
Updated to 2 February 2018.

References

External links

 

1982 births
Living people
Hannan University alumni
Association football people from Aichi Prefecture
Japanese footballers
J1 League players
J2 League players
Oita Trinita players
Omiya Ardija players
FC Gifu players
Ehime FC players
Association football defenders